Maku County is in West Azerbaijan province, Iran. The capital of the county is the city of Maku. At the 2006 census, the county's population was 174,578 in 39,765 households. The following census in 2011 counted 88,863 people in 22,874 households, by which time Poldasht District and Showt District had been separated from the county to form Poldasht County and Showt County, respectively. At the 2016 census, Maku County's population was 94,751 in 27,009 households.

Administrative divisions

The population history and structural changes of Maku County's administrative divisions over three consecutive censuses are shown in the following table. The latest census shows two districts, five rural districts, and two cities.

References

 

Counties of West Azerbaijan Province